Miramar Beach may refer to:

 Miramar Beach, California, in San Mateo County
 Miramar Beach, Florida
 Miramar Beach, Goa, India
 Rosewood Miramar Beach, a hotel in Montecito, Santa Barbara County, California, operated by Rosewood Hotels & Resorts